Pune-Okayama Friendship Garden or Pu La Deshpande Udyan is one of the largest gardens in Pune located on Tanaji Malusare road (Sinhgad road) in Pune, Maharashtra, India.

Details
The garden was inspired by the 300-year-old Kōraku-en Garden in Okayama, so it is also called the Pune-Okayama Friendship Garden. The garden has naturally flowing water from a canal, and this flow has been spread across the garden. The garden is well maintained, and walking on the lawn is not allowed.  The garden is built on 10 acres. The style is devised in such a way that people can take a walk through a garden enjoying the landscape, which changes along the garden paths. Visitors can see colourful fish from on top of a small bridge in the center of garden. This Japanese garden has been named after Pu La Deshpande, a well known Marathi writer from Maharashtra, India.

Pune-Okayama Friendship Garden - Phase II
The phase 2 of this garden is known as Mughal Garden and is a replica of the Mughal garden in Rashtrapati Bhavan, New Delhi. BJP corporator took up project to install Surya Namaskar statues and those have been opened to public on 19 June 2017 by Mukta Tilak.

Events
Well known film shootings have taken place at this garden such as the shoot for popular Bollywood actor Salman Khan's song "I Love you" from the movie "Bodyguard"

Transport
The garden is located at Sinhagad road and can be reached by bus, taxi or Auto Rickshaw. This garden is a busy place during the weekends and school holidays.

References

External links

 Article in Maayboli in Marathi
 News in Sakal newspaper in Marathi
 Pune-Okayama Friendship Garden (Pu La Deshpande Garden) punemate.com
 Pu La Deshpande Garden, Pune (Wikimapia)

Parks in Pune
Gardens in India
India–Japan relations